also Mount Iwo is an active rhyolitic lava dome on Iōjima in Kagoshima Prefecture, Japan. It sits within the borders of the town of Mishima.

The mountain is made up of non-alkali felsic rock and pyroclasitic flows.

References 

 VolcanoWorld - Kikai, Kyūshū, Japan
 S. Hamasaki, Volcanic-related alteration and geochemistry of Iwodake volcano, Satsuma-Iwojima, Kyushu, SW Japan, Earth Planets Space, pp 217–229, 2002, Tsukuba, Research Center for Deep Geological Environments, Geological Survey of Japan, AIST,

External links 
 Satsuma-Iojima - Japan Meteorological Agency 
  - Japan Meteorological Agency
 Satsuma-iojima - Geological Survey of Japan
 Kikai - Geological Survey of Japan
 

Io
Active volcanoes
Io
Io